The 1986 Strongbow Irish Professional Championship was a professional invitational snooker tournament, which took place between 20 and 23 May 1986 at the Maysfield Leisure Centre in Belfast, Northern Ireland.

Dennis Taylor won the title beating Alex Higgins 10–7 in the final.

Main draw

References

Irish Professional Championship
Irish Professional Championship
Irish Professional Championship
Irish Professional Championship